Daphnella pessulata, common name the barred pleurotoma, is a species of sea snail, a marine gastropod mollusk in the family Raphitomidae.

J.K.Tucker considers this species as a synonym of Gingicithara pessulata, family Mangeliidae.

Description
(Original description) The yellow or ash-coloured shell is rather sharply fusiform. The whorls are slightly convex, longitudinally ribbed. The ribs are rather distant, crossed with somewhat obsolete transverse striae. Although the ribs in this species are comparatively distant from each other, they vary considerably in this respect in different individuals: the more elongated the shell, the closer the ribs. The outer lip is thin. The sinus is small. The siphonal canal is rather short, a little recurved.

Distribution
This marine species occurs off the Philippines.

References

External links
 Lovell Reeve, " Descriptions of new species of Shells figured in the Conchologia Iconica,'"; "Annals and magazine of natural history : including zoology, botany and geology" vol. 14 , 1844
  Tucker, J.K. 2004 Catalog of recent and fossil turrids (Mollusca: Gastropoda). Zootaxa 682: 1–1295.

pessulata
Gastropods described in 1843